Robert Nastanovich (born August 27, 1967) is an American musician and member of the indie rock band Pavement, as well as a former member of Silver Jews, Ectoslavia, Pale Horse Riders, and Misshapen Lodge.

Early life
Bob Nastanovich was born in Rochester, New York. When he was in middle school, his family moved to the town of Richmond, Virginia.

Career 
He attended the University of Virginia, where he met Pavement's Stephen Malkmus and future Silver Jews leader David Berman. The three moved to Jersey City, New Jersey, living and working together at various jobs in art galleries (as security guards) and Nastanovich as a bus driver/bus terminal manager in New York City and Hoboken. It was during this period that Malkmus reunited with longtime friend Scott Kannberg to create the first (then unofficial) Pavement album Slanted and Enchanted in drummer Gary Young's makeshift home studio. It is also during this time that the seeds for the future Silver Jews (Nastanovich, Malkmus and Berman) were planted.

Nastanovich, upon his introduction to the band in 1990, performed many functions – namely backing vocals, percussion, harmonica, and effects-based keyboard. Initially, his key role was that of assistant time keeper, effectively focusing the efforts of the distracted and eccentric Young. Nastanovich remained a member of the band after Young left, although Steve West became the new drummer.

Nastanovich sang lead vocals on live performances of the songs "Debris Slide," "Conduit for Sale," and "Unfair." He's known for his stage presence and his trademark scream.

Nastanovich also played on several Silver Jews records. He has tour managed Stephen Malkmus and the Jicks, the Frogs, Huggy Bear, Fila Brazillia (road crew) and Silver Jews. In addition, he has played on recordings by Palace Brothers, Tall Dwarfs and Pale Horse Riders. Nastanovich is also a sometime member of the improvising post-rock-ish band Misshapen Lodge, formed in Hull on one of his visits to the city.

He rejoined Pavement for their worldwide reunion tours in 2010 and 2022.

He currently cohosts The 3 Songs Podcast with Mike Hogan and runs Broker's Tip Records who release 7-inch singles.

Other activities
Nastanovich is a fan of thoroughbred horse racing, and owns, breeds and manages many horses in his current home of Des Moines, Iowa. After Pavement's split, he served as jockey agent for Greta Kuntzweiler and Joe Johnson.

Personal life
Nastanovich married artist Whitney Grey Courtney on February 21, 2009.

He is currently employed as a chart caller for Equibase, and works at Prairie Meadows in Altoona, Iowa. He also reports on various racetracks for the Daily Racing Form as a free-lance writer and correspondent.

By visiting Epsom Race Course on August 27, 2012, Nastanovich, celebrating his 45th birthday, became the first known American citizen to attend horse racing fixtures at all 60 British race courses.

As of 2022, Nastanovich resides in Paris, TN, where he owns and breeds race horses. He named one of his horses Range Life after the Pavement song. Nastanovich owns and operates the record label Brokers Tip Records.

Discography

With Pavement

EPs 
 Watery, Domestic (1992)

Albums 
 Crooked Rain, Crooked Rain (1994)
 Wowee Zowee  (1995)
 Brighten the Corners (1997)
 Terror Twilight (1999)

With Silver Jews

Singles and EPs 
Arizona Record (1992)

Compilation 
Early Times (2011)

Albums 
Starlite Walker (1994)
Tanglewood Numbers (2005)

Miscellaneous 
 2018 – Vocals on the song Send In The Drums (Turnstyle)

References

Living people
American rock drummers
American indie rock musicians
American multi-instrumentalists
1967 births
20th-century American drummers
American male drummers
Silver Jews members
Pavement (band) members
20th-century American male musicians